The Atlantic Hockey Regular Season Scoring Trophy is an annual award given out at the conclusion of the Atlantic Hockey regular season to the player(s) that finishes with the highest point total (combined goals and assists). Atlantic Hockey is the only Division I conference that formally recognizes its scoring champion.

Award winners

Winners by school

Winners by position

See also
Atlantic Hockey Awards

References 

College ice hockey trophies and awards in the United States